Disney on Ice, originally Walt Disney's World on Ice, is a series of touring ice shows produced by Feld Entertainment's Ice Follies And Holiday on Ice, Inc. under agreement with The Walt Disney Company. Aimed primarily at children, the shows feature figure skaters  portraying the roles of Disney characters in performances derived from various Disney films. Feld Entertainment licensed the rights to Disney material for ice shows and includes shared merchandising revenue between Disney and Ice Follies.

History
Soon after Mattel's Irvin & Kenneth Feld Productions purchased Ice Follies and Holiday on Ice in 1979, the company approached Disney about doing a Disney-related show on ice. Feld Productions licensed the rights to Disney material for ice shows. In 1981, they began productions under the name Walt Disney's World on Ice.

In March 1982, Irvin & Kenneth Feld purchased back Feld Productions from Mattel including Ice Follies/Walt Disney's World on Ice. In 1987, Walt Disney's World on Ice made its international debut in Japan with Happy Birthday Donald. In 1988, the company had five touring shows. The name was changed to "Disney on Ice" in 1998. By 2008, a new show was launched every year.

Shows

The show is usually hosted by Mickey Mouse assisted at times by Minnie Mouse, Goofy, and Donald Duck. More recently, the series features segments about the Disney Princesses, Frozen, Beauty and the Beast, The Lion King, and Moana (in most shows). A new production is launched almost every year.

In 2020, Disney on Ice shows were cancelled worldwide due to the COVID-19 pandemic. Performances eventually resumed on November 6, 2020, beginning with "Dream Big".

Current shows
Road Trip Adventures (2019 and 2022)
Mickey's Search Party (2018 and 2021)
Find Your Hero (2012, 2021, and 2022) - originally known as Rockin' Ever After, Magical Ice Festival, and Reach for the Stars.
Mickey and Friends (2009 and 2021) – Formerly known as Celebrations!, Let's Celebrate, Let's Party!, Mickey's Super Celebration and Celebrate Memories.
Worlds of Enchantment (2008) - originally known as Worlds of Fantasy.
Into the Magic (2002 and 2022)  - originally Princess Classics, Dare to Dream and Live Your Dreams.
Dream Big (2000, 2006, and 2021) - originally Disney's Jungle Adventures and Princess Wishes and then Princesses and Heroes.
Let's Celebrate (1999, 2021, and 2022) – Originally known as 75 Years of Disney Magic 100 Years of Disney Magical Moments 100 Years of Magic The Magical World of Disney on Ice All Star Parade and Everyone's Story. Featuring 50 Disney characters from 14 classic stories with 30 songs.
Frozen & Encanto (2022)
The Lion King (2023) - Originally known as Disney THE LION KING based on the 1994 Walt Disney animated film of the same name.

References

External links
 
 Disney On Ice Auditions - Feld Entertainment

1981 introductions
Disney Theatrical Group
Feld Entertainment
Ice shows
Events at Malmö Arena